Lotti is a Danish, German, and Swedish feminine given name that is a diminutive form of Charlotte or Lieselotte, an alternate form of Lotte, and that is also related to Lisa, Elisa and Elisabeth. Notable people with the name include the following:

Given name
Lotti Golden (born 1949), American singer-songwriter, record producer, poet and artist
Lotti Huber (1912–1998), German actress

Nickname
Lotti Fraser, birth name Charlotte Elizabeth Fraser, (born 1989), English actress and singer
Lotti Tschanz, whose full name is Charlotte Tschanz (born 1933), Swiss archer
Lotti van der Gaag, Charlotte van der Gaag (1923 – 1999), Dutch sculptor and painter

See also

Loti (disambiguation)
Lott (disambiguation)
Lotta (name)
Lotte (name)
Lottia mesoleuca
Lottie (name)
Lotto (disambiguation)
Lotty

Notes

Danish feminine given names
German feminine given names
Swedish feminine given names